HD 147018 c is a gas giant extrasolar planet which orbits the G-type main sequence star HD 147018, located approximately 140 light years away in the constellation Triangulum Australe. It has mass at least six and a half time more than Jupiter and orbits HD 147018 nearly twice the distance between the Earth and the Sun. This planet is eight times farther away than HD 147018 b. This planet was discovered on August 11, 2009 by radial velocity method.

References 

 

Exoplanets discovered in 2009
Giant planets
Triangulum Australe
Exoplanets detected by radial velocity